Leonardo Rodrigues Lima (born 2 August 1998), known as Léo Jabá, is a Brazilian professional footballer who plays as a forward for São Bernardo.

Club career

Early career
Born on August 2, 1998, in the Brazilian city of São Paulo, Léo Jabá (full name Leonardo Rodrigues Lima) stands at 1.78 meters tall, capable of competing up front or in his preferred position on the left wing. Technically gifted, Jabá is at his best when taking on opponents in 1-on-1 situations, beating his markers with fantastic shows of skill. Jabá joined Corinthians when he was 11 years old.

Immediately from a young age, Jabá stood out with his qualities, impressing with the Corinthians youth-set up. The young forward makes life difficult for opposing players when in possession of the ball, able to turn on the gas, display silky moves and compete with a mature calmness. When Brazil played against Singapore at an under 15's tournament, Singaporean coach Nazir Nasir was taken aback by Jabá's performance, revealing that he has everything required to be a great footballer.

He was part of the 2016 Copa São Paulo de Futebol Júnior and 2016 U20 Campeonato Brasileiro squads that ended up as runner up in both tournaments.

Corinthians
Jabá made his unofficial professional debut in a friendly on 22 July 2015, as he entered in the second half of Corinthians' 1–0 victory against ABC at Natal.

He made his official debut as a substitute during the second half of a 1–0 against Internacional on November 21.

Akhmat Grozny

Having attracted plenty of interest from Europe, Jaba opted to join Akhmat Grozny of the Russian Premier League in summer 2017, costing the Chechnya club a grand total of €2.5 million. While not setting the world on fire, he did make an impression in Russia, netting three goals in 24 championship matches. In comparison to his time at Corinthians, his role changed slightly with Akhmat, gifted a license to roam and create goalscoring opportunities without worrying about defensive duties.

PAOK
On 20 June 2018, PAOK signed Jabá from Akhmat Grozny on a five-year deal. PAOK strengthened their attacking line, paying €3.5 million for the forward.

On 15 September 2018, he scored his first goal of the 2018-19 Super League season as his teammate Diego Biseswar dummied for him to hit an unstoppable shot past Giorgos Strezos in a 3–1 away win against OFI.

On 4 October 2018, the 20-year-old was the star of the show for PAOK, teeing up Aleksandar Prijović for his sixth-minute opening goal and then scoring twice after 11 and 17 minutes to put PAOK firmly in command, before assisted to Dimitris Pelkas in a 4–1 away emphatic win against BATE Borisov in Belarus in the UEFA Europa League group stage. His performance earned him an award as most valuable football player of the second matchday of the Europa League Group stage, chosen ahead of Alfredo Morelos, Patrick Cutrone and Islam Slimani. On 3 March 2019, he scored a crucial goal, despite his red card in the second half, sealing a 2–0 away win against rivals Panathinaikos in his club's effort to win the title undefeated.

On 8 March 2019, he was reported to have attracted attention from teams such as Porto, Newcastle United and Anderlecht. He finished the season with 39 appearances (7 goals, 11 assists) in all competitions.
In November 2019, has fallen out of favour with head coach Abel Ferreira after a poor run of form in the beginning of 2019–20 season. He has struggled this time around, not contributing with any goals or assists in nine matches, and reports have indicated that the out-of-favour Brazilian could seek a transfer request in January.

In May 2020, the Brazilian is close to completing seven months of inactivity. His last appearance was on October 20, 2019, in the 3–0 home game against Lamia, a game in which he was a late substitute. Reports indicate that Jabá was recently hospitalised in Thessaloniki to puncture his knee after continuous swelling. It has been a frustrating campaign for the attacking livewire this season, as he has only made nine appearances.

On 4 December 2020, the young Brazilian decided to travel to his homeland in the middle of a COVID-19 pandemic, presupposing the need to have treatments on his injured knee that will definitely prevent him to be  participate in his club's obligations.
On 23 March 2021, Jabá was very close to wear Atlético Goianiense's jersey, on loan, however the contract did not proceed as the 22-year-old Brazilian midfielder invoked personal reasons. Vasco da Gama has put Leo Jabá on its list, despite its relegation to the 2nd division of Brazil. On 26 November 2021, Jabá said goodbye to Vasco da Gama with a lengthy post on Instagram and is preparing to return to Thessaloniki to be evaluated by Răzvan Lucescu. The Brazilian midfielder has been out of the team for about a week now, in order to take time to rest, as Vasco da Gama, did not want to keep him in its potential.

On 12 January 2022, the most remarkable event in a 2–0 home win game against Panetolikos was the return of Jabá to an official game of PAOK after 488 days, where in the first minute of the delays with a powerful shot scored and celebrated his goal by knocking down his coach Răzvan Lucescu.

São Bernardo 
On 8 December 2022, Léo Jabá was announced as the new signing for Brazilian Série C side São Bernardo.

Career statistics

Honours
Corinthians
Campeonato Paulista: 2017
PAOK
Super League Greece: 2018–19
Greek Cup: 2018–19;Runner-Up :2021–22

References

1998 births
Living people
Footballers from São Paulo
Brazilian footballers
Brazil under-20 international footballers
Association football forwards
Sport Club Corinthians Paulista players
FC Akhmat Grozny players
PAOK FC players
CR Vasco da Gama players
Campeonato Brasileiro Série A players
Campeonato Brasileiro Série B players
Russian Premier League players
Super League Greece players
Brazilian expatriate footballers
Expatriate footballers in Russia
Expatriate footballers in Greece